The 2011 Belarusian First League is the 21st season of 2nd level football in Belarus. It started on April 23 and will end in November 2011.

Team changes from 2010 season
The winners of last season (Gomel) were promoted to Belarusian Premier League. They were replaced by last-placed team of 2010 Belarusian Premier League table (Partizan Minsk).

The runners-up of last season (SKVICH Minsk) lost the promotion/relegation play-off to Torpedo Zhodino (11th-placed Premier League team) and both clubs stayed in their respective leagues.

Two teams that finished at the bottom of 2010 season table (Kommunalnik Slonim and Lida) relegated to the Second League. They were replaced by two best teams of 2010 Second League (Gorodeya and Slutsksakhar Slutsk).

Veras Nesvizh withdrew from the league and disbanded due to lack of financing. They were replaced by Klechesk Kletsk, who finished 3rd in last year's Second League.

Slutsksakhar Slutsk changed their name to FC Slutsk prior to the season.

Teams and venues

League table

Promotion play-offs
The runners-up of 2011 Belarusian First League Partizan Minsk played a two-legged promotion play-off against the 11th placed team of 2011 Premier League (Vitebsk) for one spot in the 2012 Premier League and won the series 3–2. As a result, Vitebsk were relegated to the First League and Partizan promoted to Premier League. Partizan, however, were unable to start the next season due to bankruptcy and were disbanded.

Results

Top goalscorers

Updated to games played on 19 November 2011 Source: football.by

See also
2011 Belarusian Premier League
2010–11 Belarusian Cup
2011–12 Belarusian Cup

External links
 Official site 

Belarusian First League seasons
2
Belarus
Belarus